Além do que os Olhos Podem Ver (English: Beyond What The Eyes Can See) is the sixth studio album by Oficina G3, released in 2005.

Track listing

Personnel
 Juninho Afram – vocals, guitar, acoustic guitar
 Duca Tambasco – bass
 Jean Carllos – keyboards
 Mauro Henrique – vocals
 Lufe – drums

References

External links
 Official website
 MK Music page

2005 albums
Oficina G3 albums
Christian rock albums by Brazilian artists